The KrisFlyer International Sprint is a former Thoroughbred horse race held at Kranji Racecourse in Singapore. Contested on turf over a left-handed course, the International Group 1 sprint race was run over a distance of 1200 meters (6 furlongs) and was open to horses aged three and older. It offered a purse of S$1,000,000 (About US$800,000).  The race was discontinued in 2015.

The KrisFlyer International Sprint is limited to fourteen starters with the following weight restrictions:
 Northern Hemisphere 3-year-olds  : 53.0 kg.
 Southern Hemisphere 4 year-olds & upwards : 57.0 kg.
 Filly/Mare allowance : 1.5 kg.

The race is named after frequent flyer program of the title sponsor Singapore Airlines and it is run on the same day as the Singapore Airlines International Cup.

For the first time, in 2001 the Kranji Racecourse hosted the Group 1 Singapore Airlines KrisFlyer Sprint. It was raced again the following year as a Group 3 event. The event was not run again until 2008 and the race has continued since then.

From 2011 the KrisFlyer International Sprint will become part of the Global Sprint Challenge Series. The race is the third leg of the series, preceded by the Takamatsunomiya Kinen and followed by the King's Stand Stakes.

In winning the 2002 edition, North Boy set a new Kranji course record for six furlongs which was bettered by Takeover Target in 2008 and then in 2009 Hong Kong's Sacred Kingdom broke the course record again with the time of 1:07.8.

Winners

References
 The KrisFlyer International Sprint at the Singapore Turf Club
 Video at YouTube of the 2008 KrisFlyer International Sprint

Graded stakes races in Singapore
Open sprint category horse races
Recurring events established in 2001
Sport in Singapore